Guy Haarscher (born 1946 in Belgium) is a professor of legal and political philosophy at the Free University of Brussels (ULB). He taught every other year from 1985 to 2008 at Duke University School of Law as an adjunct professor of law. He also taught at the Central European University in Budapest from 1992 to 2008 as a recurrent visiting professor. Guy Haarscher currently teaches at the ULB, as well as at the College of Europe in Bruges.

Awards
1989: Prix des Droits de l'Homme de la Communauté française de Belgique for Philosophie des droits de l'homme''', Editions de l'Université Libre de Bruxelles, 4e édition 1989.
1982: Prix Duculot de l'Académie Royale de Belgique (Classe des Lettres), 1981, for L'ontologie de Marx,

Publications

BooksLa laïcité Paris : Presses universitaires de France, 2004 . 205 copies in American and UK libraries, according to 
Polish translation "Laickość : Kościół, państwo, religia", 2004Le fantôme de la liberté : la servitude volontaire de l'homme moderne. Bruxelles: Editions Labor, 1997. Les Médias entre droit et pouvoir : redéfinir la liberté de la presse  1995.Après le communisme : les bouleversements de la théorie politique 1993Chaim Perelman et la pensée contemporaine 1993Laïcité et droits de l'homme : deux siècles de conquêtes 1989Philosophie des droits de l'homme 2. ed. Editions de l'Université de Bruxelles, 1989 La raison du plus fort : philosophie du politique  1988L'ontologie de Marx : le problème de l'action, des textes de jeunesse à l'œuvre de maturité 1980Philosophie des droits de l'homme 1957

Peer-reviewed articles
"Freedom of Religion in Context". Brigham Young University Law Review. 2002, no. 2: 269–281.
"Perelman and Habermas" Law and Philosophy,''  Dec., 1986, vol. 5, no. 3, p. 331–342

References

External links
 Guy Haarscher's page at the ULB

Living people
Political philosophers
Philosophers of law
20th-century Belgian philosophers
21st-century Belgian philosophers
Academic staff of the College of Europe
1946 births